Jefferson Public Library may refer to:

Jefferson Public Library (Jefferson, Iowa), listed on the National Register of Historic Places in Greene County, Iowa
Jefferson Public Library (Jefferson, Wisconsin), listed on the National Register of Historic Places in Jefferson County, Wisconsin
Jefferson Public Library, a part of the Piedmont Regional Library System
The Library of Congress, which began with the donation of Thomas Jefferson's private library.